Groove Music (formerly Xbox Music or Zune Music Pass) is a discontinued audio player software application included with Windows 8, Windows 8.1 and Windows 10.

The app is also associated with a now-discontinued music streaming service, Groove Music Pass, which was supported across Windows, Xbox video game consoles, Windows Phone, as well as Android and iOS. As of 2014, The Groove catalogue had over 50 million tracks. Its subscription service Groove Music Pass was officially discontinued on December 31, 2017, and the Android and iOS versions of the Groove Music app were discontinued in December 2018, restricting the player to its native Microsoft Store base.

Groove Music was superseded by Media Player in Windows 10 and Windows 11.

History 
Microsoft had previously ventured into music services with its Zune brand. The Zune Music Marketplace included 11 million tracks. The line of Zune players and Zune music store were somewhat unsuccessful, and the brand was largely discontinued at the beginning of the 2010s, although it continued to exist on different devices and the Zune Music Pass offered unlimited access to songs for US$9.99 per month.

During its E3 2012 press conference, and in the wake of the upcoming release of Windows 8. Microsoft announced the relaunch of the service as Xbox Music. With the accompanying announcement of Xbox Video, this move was intended to position Xbox as the company's main entertainment brand. Both services launched on October 16, 2012.

On July 6, 2015, Microsoft announced the re-branding of Xbox Music as Groove to tie in with the impending release of Windows 10. The new brand utilized the Microsoft-owned "Groove" trademark formerly used for the unrelated product Microsoft Office Groove (now OneDrive for Business). Joe Belfiore explained that the re-branding was intended to disassociate the service from the Xbox product line, making it more inclusive to non-Xbox platforms.

On October 2, 2017, Microsoft announced that its subscription service, Groove Music Pass, and music purchases on Windows Store would be discontinued after December 31, 2017, leaving support for playing music stored locally and on OneDrive. At the same time, Microsoft began advertising the competing service Spotify, displaying a banner ad for the service within the Groove Music user interface, and offering the ability to migrate music collections and playlists to Spotify. As a side effect of the discontinuation, on May 31, 2018, Microsoft additionally announced that the Groove Music apps for Android and iOS would also be discontinued and cease functioning on December 1, 2018, with users being redirected to Google Play Music and iTunes Match for similar cloud synchronization functionality (the OneDrive app still offered limited music playback functions within).

Microsoft began phasing out the Groove Music app for Windows 10 in January 2023, replacing it with the Media Player app introduced in Windows 11 via an update from the Microsoft Store.

Groove Music Pass 
Groove Music Pass (formerly Xbox Music Pass and Zune Music Pass) is a discontinued pay subscription service that allowed unlimited streaming of the service's catalog on any device with the service installed. The pricing in the U.S. included monthly and annual subscriptions. A one-month trial offer was available, but those who previously tried the Zune Music Pass subscription prior to the rebranding were ineligible for this offer. An advertising-supported streaming tier was previously available, but discontinued effective December 1, 2014. Music could also be purchased directly from Windows Store.

Users' purchased music, and playlists consisting of songs available on the service could be synced through OneDrive and accessed from multiple devices. Songs in a user's local library on a Windows 8.1 PC could be matched and made available to other devices if available on Groove Music Pass. Custom "radio stations" could be generated using songs related to user-selected songs. Songs could be downloaded for offline listening on smartphones. Uploading of non-Groove music became available on Windows 10.

Windows 10's Anniversary Update allowed users to hide features that require a Groove Music Pass from the interface.

On October 2, 2017, Microsoft announced the discontinuation of the Groove Music Pass service effective December 31, 2017. Existing subscribers were refunded, and Microsoft began promoting Spotify as an alternative by allowing saved playlists to be migrated to the service.

Cloud Collection 

Groove Music lets users create a collection of songs and playlists that roam through the cloud on all the supported devices. The songs can be added from the Groove Music Store or matched (within the Groove Music Catalog) to songs either saved locally on the user's machine or uploaded to the user's OneDrive account for the country the user is in.

APIs for developers 

The Groove Music API provides access to RESTful web services for developers to leverage the catalog and features of the service in their application or website.

Geographical availability

Countries where Groove was available included:

  
  
  
  
  
  
  
  
  
 
  
  
  (Store only)

Supported formats 

The app in Windows 10 supports a number of formats, including: 
.mp3
.flac
.aac
.m4a
.wav
.wma
.ac3
.3gp
.3g2
.amr
.mka
.ogg (on Windows 10 version 1903 and newer)
.opus (on Windows 10 version 1903 and newer)

See also
Microsoft Movies & TV
Bing Audio
MixRadio
Windows Media Player
Media Player (Windows 11)

References

External links
 Official website (Archive)

Microsoft cloud services
Music streaming services
Jukebox-style media players
Online music database clients
Digital audio
Groove Music
Universal Windows Platform apps
Computer-related introductions in 2012
Telecommunications-related introductions in 2012
Audiovisual introductions in 2012
Microsoft websites
Microsoft software
Windows media players
Xbox
Xbox One software
Products and services discontinued in 2017
2012 software
Zune